The 1939–40 season was Colchester United's third season in their history and their third in the Southern League. Alongside competing in the Southern League, the club were also due to participate in the Southern League Mid-Week Section, FA Cup and Southern League Cup. They were also due to play the Southern League Cup matches remaining from the previous season during the campaign, but only played the outstanding semi-final fixture against Norwich City Reserves. The season was to end prematurely, with competitive football abandoned with the outbreak of World War II. Colchester United played regular season fixtures until 2 September 1939, with the 0–0 draw at Layer Road with Ipswich Town Reserves the final competitive fixture to be played by the club for almost six years.

Season overview
War loomed over Europe during the beginning of the 1939–40 campaign. After kicking the season off with a win against Plymouth Argyle Reserves on 26 August 1939, Colchester played Norwich City Reserves in the first-leg of the delayed Southern League Cup semi-final, beating their opponents 5–1. After only three Southern League games, World War II was declared, and as with predecessors Colchester Town during World War I, the club closed down, denying the club a chance to earn League football after gaining considerable momentum over the previous two seasons.

Colchester United continued to play friendlies against local opposition until December 1939, when the Army Fire Fighting Corp took over Layer Road for drill practice. The ground itself did continued to host matches during hostilities, as a number of high-profile military encounters took place at the stadium. The influx of military personnel through Colchester Garrison ensured that Layer Road played host to a number of star players through the war years.

Players

Transfers

In

 Total spending:  ~ £1,100

Out

Match details

Friendlies

Southern League

Southern League Cup

Squad statistics

Appearances and goals

|-
!colspan="14"|Players who appeared for Colchester who left during the season

|}

Goalscorers

Disciplinary record

Captains
Number of games played as team captain.

Clean sheets
Number of games goalkeepers kept a clean sheet.

Player debuts
Players making their first-team Colchester United debut in a fully competitive match.

See also
List of Colchester United F.C. seasons

References

General

Specific

1939-40
English football clubs 1939–40 season